Nandus is a genus of Asian leaffishes native to southern and southeastern Asia.

Species
The currently recognized species in this genus are:
 Nandus andrewi H. H. Ng & Jaafar, 2008
 Nandus meni Hossain & Sarker, 2013
 Nandus mercatus H. H. Ng, 2008
 Nandus nandus (F. Hamilton, 1822) (Gangetic leaffish)
 Nandus nebulosus (J. E. Gray, 1835) (Bornean leaffish)
 Nandus oxyrhynchus H. H. Ng, Vidthayanon & P. K. L. Ng, 1996
 Nandus prolixus Chakrabarty, Oldfield & H. H. Ng, 2006

References

Nandidae